The Moreton Bay Houses residential project consists of twin houses located beside Moreton Bay in Queensland, designed by Andresen O'Gorman Architects in 2001.

The building
The design exploits the subtropical climate of Queensland by layering multiple timber screens to create an ambiguous threshold between the inside and outside and allow for cooling breezes to penetrate the interior while shading from the summer sun. To conform with zoning regulations, the original intention of four separate apartments over two adjoining lots was adapted to two houses built with shared gardens and central external circulation space. This created a combined scale that visually matches the surrounding houses. The houses reference Japanese courtyard houses. Each house has a two-storey linear wing flanked by double height space at either end, the residual space between creating the courtyard.

References

External links
Picture of the Moreton Bay Houses

Buildings and structures in South East Queensland
2001 establishments in Australia